Yelia Rural LLG is a local-level government (LLG) of Eastern Highlands Province, Papua New Guinea.

Wards
01. Garipme
02. Marawaka Station
03. Kwalusila
04. Marawaka
05. Giliwato
06. Gawoi
07. Sindainya
08. Jomuru
09. Yamuru
10. Mala
11. Sinei
12. Asenave
13. Boiko
14. Malari
15. Devevi
16. Yelia
17. Sesai / Tjejai
18. Kandwe / Miniri
19. Dungkwi
20. Ijelelukore
21. Nire
22. Pinji
23. Ororingo
24. Wiobo
25. Yanyi
26. Wapme/Wonenara
27. Butnari
28. Yabwiara
29. Orobina
30. Andakombi
31. Met'naka
32. Yakana
33. Simogu
34. Kamoiriba

See also
Yelia (volcano)

References

Local-level governments of Eastern Highlands Province